Alexandra "Alex" Carpenter (born April 13, 1994) is an American ice hockey player and member of the United States women's national team. She most recently played in the 2020–21 season of the Zhenskaya Hockey League (ZhHL) with the KRS Vanke Rays and served as team captain. The first player drafted into the National Women's Hockey League in 2015, she won a silver medal with the 2014 United States Olympic team, won the 2015 Patty Kazmaier Award, and was named ZhHL MVP in 2020.

Playing career
While in middle school, she played for a male hockey team in Bethlehem, New York. Noteworthy teammates included her younger brother Robert Carpenter as well as Jonathan Clark, Sam Segal, Danny Golderman, and Jake Nussbaum. In the fall of 2007, she joined The Governor's Academy in South Byfield, Massachusetts. Carpenter played for the Governor's Academy varsity team as a 13-year-old. She racked up a total of 155 goals and 136 assists for 291 points over three years.

NCAA
On July 22, 2010, she committed to joining the Boston College Eagles women's ice hockey program in the fall of 2012.

Alex recorded her 100th career point against UConn Feb 17 of her sophomore season with Boston College (BC).

During her junior season (2014–15) at Boston College, Carpenter was the recipient of the 2015 Patty Kazmaier Award. She was the first player in the history of the Boston College Eagles program, and the first player from the Hockey East conference to claim the award.

USA Hockey
Carpenter competed for Team USA under-18 in an Under-18 three-game exhibition series against Canada's best in Calgary, Alberta. She helped the US team win the 2009 Czech Challenge Cup in Prague. She scored a goal for Team USA in the gold medal game of the 2010 IIHF World Women's Under 18 Championship but the team ultimately fell to Canada and had to settle for the silver medal. She was the youngest girl for Team USA in the tournament at fifteen-years-old. She finished the tournament with eight goals and one assist in five games. She was tied for second in team scoring behind Kendall Coyne.

In 2013, she made the women's senior team and participated in the 2013 IIHF Women's World Championship and remained on Team USA for every following season, including the 2014 Olympics. Carpenter scored the game-winning overtime goal to lead the United States to a 1–0 win over Canada at the 2016 Women's World Championship. She was one of the final cuts from the 2018 Olympic team, but was brought back for the 2019 World Championship. , Carpenter has participated in five IIHF World Championships with the United States senior team, claiming gold at all five tournaments.

On January 2, 2022, Carpenter was named to Team USA's roster to represent the United States at the 2022 Winter Olympics.

Professional
Carpenter was the first player drafted in the National Women's Hockey League's (NWHL) inaugural draft in 2015, selected by the New York Riveters. She returned for her senior season with Boston College and her rights were traded to the Boston Pride in April 2016. During the summer of 2016, Carpenter signed with the Boston Pride for a one-year, $19,500 contract, making her the highest paid player of the 2015 NWHL Draft class. Playing for Team Steadman, Carpenter recorded a goal and an assist at the 2nd NWHL All-Star Game. She finished the 2016–17 season as the second highest scorer in the league.

Following her season in the NWHL, Carpenter registered for the 2017 Draft of the Canadian Women's Hockey League (CWHL) and was drafted by one of the two Chinese expansion teams, Kunlun Red Star WIH based in Shenzhen. During the 2017–18 KHL season, her father, Bobby Carpenter, was a coach for HC Kunlun Red Star of the Kontinental Hockey League (KHL), the men's club that owned the Kunlun Red Star WIH. After being cut from the United States Olympic team, she signed with Kunlun Red Star on January 15, 2018. The following season, the two Chinese CWHL teams were merged to become the Shenzhen KRS Vanke Rays, and Carpenter re-signed with the team.

After the 2018–19 CWHL season, the CWHL ceased operations, and the team joined the Women's Hockey League (ZhHL). Carpenter again chose to remain in China, citing the better facilities and player support provided by the team than what she had experienced in the NWHL, supporting the boycott of North American leagues that had led to the formation of the Professional Women's Hockey Players Association (PWHPA).

Career statistics

NCAA
Source:

USA Hockey

Professional

Awards and honors
2015 Patty Kazmaier Award
2015 CCM Hockey Women's Division I All-Americans, First Team
2015 first overall pick in the NWHL draft by the New York Riveters

IIHF
Best Forward, 2011 IIHF World Women's U18 Championship
Best Forward, 2012 IIHF World Women's U18 Championship

Hockey East
Hockey East Rookie of the Month (Month of October 2011)
Hockey East Player of the Week (Week of December 12, 2011)
Hockey East Rookie of the Month (Month of December 2011)
Hockey East Player of the Month (October 2014) 
Hockey East Player of the Month (November 2014)
Hockey East Player of the Week (Week of December 15, 2014)
2014–15 Hockey East First Team All-Star

Personal
Carpenter is the daughter of former NHL player Bobby Carpenter.

Alex Carpenter was the first girl to play in the Morristown, New Jersey, Little League in 25 years (performing as a pitcher, catcher, and shortstop) and was the first girl to play as a 10-year-old.

Carpenter is an out member of the LGBTQ community. She became engaged to girlfriend Steph Klein, an assistant equipment manager with the Toronto Marlies, in January 2022.

References

External links

Alex Carpenter at USA Hockey

1994 births
Living people
American women's ice hockey forwards
Patty Kazmaier Award winners
Shenzhen KRS Vanke Rays players
Boston Pride players
Boston College Eagles women's ice hockey players
Ice hockey players at the 2014 Winter Olympics
Ice hockey players at the 2022 Winter Olympics
Medalists at the 2014 Winter Olympics
Medalists at the 2022 Winter Olympics
Olympic silver medalists for the United States in ice hockey
People from North Reading, Massachusetts
Sportspeople from Middlesex County, Massachusetts
Ice hockey players from Massachusetts
American expatriate ice hockey players in Russia
American expatriate ice hockey players in China
The Governor's Academy alumni
21st-century American women
American LGBT sportspeople
LGBT ice hockey players